Julia May Whelan (born May 8, 1984) is an American actress and author. She is best known for her role as Grace Manning on the television family drama series Once and Again (1999–2002), and her co-starring role in the 2002 Lifetime movie The Secret Life of Zoey. A noted child actor, Whelan first appeared on screen at the age of 11, and continued to take television roles until her matriculation into Middlebury College in 2004; Whelan graduated magna cum laude from Middlebury in 2008 after spending the 2006–2007 academic year as a visiting student at Lincoln College, Oxford. Whelan returned to film acting in November 2008 with a role in the fantasy thriller Fading of the Cries.

Early life
Julia May Whelan was born in Oregon on May 8, 1984. Her father was a firefighter and her mother a teacher.  Whelan first acted in community theater at the age of five, and yearly trips to the Oregon Shakespeare Festival in Ashland, Oregon deepened her interest in an acting career. At age ten she began acting lessons with actor/screenwriter Geof Prysirr. Prysirr developed a close professional and personal relationship with Whelan, eventually becoming her guardian. Prysirr began escorting Whelan on trips to Los Angeles, where she soon found professional success.

Whelan moved to Los Angeles with Prysirr and his wife, Days of Our Lives actress Derya Ruggles, where the three took up residence in a two-bedroom apartment so that Whelan could advance her career. Whelan quickly began to win television roles, first appearing on screen in an April 8, 1996, episode of the drama series Nowhere Man.

Early acting career
Whelan was first introduced to a broader audience in the 1998 TV movie Fifteen and Pregnant as the younger sister of Kirsten Dunst, who portrayed the movie's pregnant protagonist.  In 1999 Whelan landed the role for which she is currently best known, playing insecure teenager Grace Manning on the family drama Once and Again.  The show cast Sela Ward and Billy Campbell as single parents trying to nurture a romance and eventually build a blended family together.

Once and Again was noted for the quality of its cast, particularly that of its younger cast members, who were noted for the sensitivity of their performances; the show featured them, giving them plot lines and screen time commensurate with those of the adult leads.  Whelan, Meredith Deane, Shane West, and Evan Rachel Wood played the children of Ward and Campbell, respectively; Mischa Barton joined the show in its final season as Evan Rachel Wood's girlfriend. This lesbian storyline was dovetailed with an equally controversial plot involving Whelan's character in a doomed romance with her high school drama teacher "Mr. Dmitri", played by Eric Stoltz.  Whelan, Deane, and Wood were recognized for their performances in April 2001, winning that year's Young Artist Award for Best Ensemble in a TV Series (Drama or Comedy); Whelan had been nominated on her own in March 2000 for Best Performance in a TV Drama Series - Supporting Young Actress.

After Once and Again wrapped up its three-year run in 2002, Whelan moved on to other projects.  She co-starred in the 2002 Lifetime Television movie, The Secret Life of Zoey, as a model student struggling with a prescription drug addiction.  Notable cast included co-star Mia Farrow portraying her mother, and Andrew McCarthy as her rehab counselor.  The movie was promoted alongside Lifetime TV rebroadcasts of Once and Again.  Whelan continued to take television roles through 2004, when she enrolled in Middlebury College.

Whelan spent the 2006-2007 academic year as a visiting student at Lincoln College, Oxford.  She returned to Middlebury for her senior year, graduating magna cum laude on May 25, 2008.

Filmography

Audiobook narration
Whelan has won acclaim for her narration of many audiobooks, including Gillian Flynn's 2012 thriller Gone Girl (co-read with Kirby Heyborne), Tara Westover's Educated, for which she won Best Female Narrator at the 2019 Audie Awards, and Nora Roberts' The Witness, for which she won Best Romance at the 2013 awards.   Whelan also narrated the award-winning novel My Year of Rest and Relaxation by Ottessa Moshfegh, the New York Times bestseller Evvie Drake Starts Over by Linda Holmes, and her own novel, My Oxford Year.

Whelan also narrates long-form nonfiction journalism, including articles from The New Yorker, The Atlantic, ProPublica, and Vanity Fair.

Author
In 2018, Whelan published a novel, My Oxford Year, which Entertainment Weekly called "a breathtakingly perfect picture of Oxford" and "a powerfully heartbreaking and life-affirming tribute to love and to choice". In 2022, she released her sophomore novel,  Thank You for Listening.

Awards and honors
AudioFile has named Whelan a Golden Voice narrator.

Awards

"Best of" lists

References

External links

 Prominent unofficial Julia Whelan website -- multimedia, links, biography
Description of character "Grace Manning" at www.oandafans.com
Photos of Whelan as "Grace Manning"
TV Guide profile of Julia Whelan, linked at www.angelfire.com/tv/onceagain
Julia Whelan Photos and Videos
Online description of Fading of the Cries

American television actresses
Living people
1984 births
Middlebury College alumni
Alumni of Lincoln College, Oxford
American child actresses
20th-century American actresses
21st-century American actresses
Actresses from Oregon
American voice actresses
Audiobook narrators